Belinda Hamnett (Cantonese: Hon Kwun-Ting) born 28 September 1975  in Hong Kong is an actress, model and ex-beauty queen.  Being crowned Miss Asia Pageant 1997 effectively launched her career in the fashion and entertainment industry.  The model turned Hong Kong film actress lives in Singapore.

Personal life 
Belinda Hamnett spent her childhood and teenage years in Singapore where her father was stationed. Her father is English and her mother is Chinese.  Hamnett resided in Changi, eastern Singapore, where she was a student at Changkat Changi Secondary School. Hamnett attended  Sunday school at St Hilda's Church in Ceylon Road.

Hamnett was awarded the title of Miss Asia in ATV's Miss Asia Pageant held in Hong Kong in 1997.

In 2006, Hamnett revealed that she has overcome anorexia with the help of medical practitioners.  Hamnett commented, “Although my body has not reached the stage the doctors approve of, but I am already very pleased. I am very happy at the moment.”

Career 
For several years she has been contracted with TVB and ATV Hong Kong broadcast companies and did several Cantonese based television series for them. She has also appeared in several movies and her photos have been featured in numerous fashion magazines. Belinda left TVB between 2005 and 2006 and was relatively silent within media and entertainment for a few years. In 2009, she returned to ATV for a new drama series.

Hamnett resides in Singapore as of 2010.

Filmography 
Television
 Women on the Run (2005) (TVB Series) Chu Chu
 Healing Hands III (2005) (TVB Series) Martha
 My Family (2005) (TVB Series) Akubi
 To Catch the Uncatchable (2004) (TVB Series) Mary Sok
 Point of No Return (2003) (TVB Series) as Law Bik-kei
Divine Retribution (2000) (ATV Series) ... Cheng Miu-miu
 My Date with a Vampire II (2000) (ATV Series) Si-nga

Movies
 Troublesome Night 6 (2000)
 Dance of a Dream (2001)
 Women from Mars (2002) - Kwun-Ting Hon
 Love For All Seasons (2003) - Cat
 Diva - Ah Hey (2003)
 Bless the Child (2003)
 Men Suddenly in Black (2003) [cameo]
 The Princess of Temple Street (2003)
 Herbal Tea (2004) - Erotic Film Director
 Love is a Many Stupid Thing (2004)
 Where is Mama's Boy? (2005) - The big sister

References

韩君婷正式告别香港娱乐圈 返新加坡定居

External links

 Fansite - Something About Belinda

1975 births
Living people
Hong Kong film actresses
Hong Kong people of English descent
Singaporean female models